

2014–15 TT Pro League

Note: Flags indicate national team as has been defined under FIFA eligibility rules. Players may hold more than one non-FIFA nationality.

National Super League
The following 12 clubs competed in the 2013 National Super League season.

 *
Trinidad and Tobago
Football clubs
Football clubs